Quintet '80 is an album by American musician David Grisman, released in 1980.

Track listing 
 Dawgma 
 Bow Wow 
 Barkley's Bug 
 Sea Of Cortez 
 Naima (John Coltrane) 
 Mugavero (John Carlini) 
 Dawgmatism 
 Thailand

Personnel

David Grisman – mandolin
Mark O'Connor – guitar
Darol Anger – violin, cello, violectra, violin arrangement of "Sea of Cortez"
Rob Wasserman – bass
Mike Marshall – guitar, mandolin, violin

with
Joan Jeanrenaud – cello
Production notes:
David Grisman - producer, arranger
Bill Wolf - engineer, mixing
Greg Fulginiti - mastering
Suzanne Phister - art direction, design
Richard Escasany - art direction, design

Chart positions

References

External links
Grateful Dead Family Discography

1980 albums
David Grisman albums
Warner Records albums